Bach the Millionaire (French: Bach millionnaire) is a 1933 French comedy film directed by Henry Wulschleger and starring Bach, Georges Tréville and Germaine Charley.

Cast
 Bach as Papillon  
 Georges Tréville as M. Vérillac  
 Germaine Charley as Madame Vérillac  
 Roger Tréville as Le marquis de Sandray  
 Simone Héliard as Jeanine  
 Charles Montel as Jules
 Sinoël as Le notaire  
 Jean-François Martial as Pernu  
 Germaine Aussey as Louise de Sandray  
 Albert Broquin as Le garde chasse
 Suzanne Micheline as Balbine
 Le Petit Patachou as Le petit Totor

References

Bibliography 
 Crisp, Colin. French Cinema—A Critical Filmography: Volume 1, 1929–1939. Indiana University Press, 2015.

External links 
 

1933 films
French comedy films
1933 comedy films
1930s French-language films
Films directed by Henry Wulschleger
French black-and-white films
1930s French films